Long Trail State Forest protects  around a portion of the Long Trail, a  hiking trail in Vermont. The forest runs through Belvidere, Eden, Lowell, Johnson, Montgomery, Waterville and Westfield in Franklin, Lamoille and Orleans counties. The forest is managed by the Vermont Department of Forests, Parks, and Recreation in partnership with the Green Mountain Club.

References

External links
 

Vermont state forests
Protected areas of Franklin County, Vermont
Protected areas of Lamoille County, Vermont
Protected areas of Orleans County, Vermont